Route 866 may refer to:

Canada

Israel
Route 866 (Israel)

United States
 
 
Territories
  Puerto Rico Highway 866